Polyipnus parini is a species of ray-finned fish in the genus Polyipnus found in the Western Pacific Ocean.

References

Sternoptychidae
Fish described in 1979